Nosislav is a market town in Brno-Country District in the South Moravian Region of the Czech Republic. It has about 1,300 inhabitants.

References

Populated places in Brno-Country District
Market towns in the Czech Republic